Murder by the Coast is a 2021 Spanish documentary film directed by Tània Balló and written by Gonzalo Berger. The film was released on Netflix on 23 June 2021.

References

External links
 
 

2021 films
Spanish documentary films
Netflix original documentary films